The International Convention for the Regulation of Whaling is an international environmental agreement aimed at the "proper conservation of whale stocks and thus make possible the orderly development of the whaling industry". It governs the commercial, scientific, and aboriginal subsistence whaling practices of 88 member nations.

The convention is a successor to the 1931 Geneva Convention for Regulation of Whaling and the 1937 International Agreement for the Regulation of Whaling, established in response to the overexploitation of whales in the post-World War I period. Neither instrument was effective, but each provided the framework for the International Convention for the Regulation of Whaling, which was spearheaded by the United States and signed by 15 nations in Washington, D.C., on 3 December 1946; the convention took effect on 10 November 1948. A protocol broadening the scope of the convention's enforcement was signed on 19 November 1956.

The objectives of the International Convention for the Regulation of Whaling are to protect all whale species from overhunting; establish a system of international regulation for whale fisheries to ensure proper conservation and development of whale stocks; and safeguard for future generations the important natural resources represented by whale stocks. The primary instrument implementing these aims is the International Whaling Commission, established by the convention as its main decision-making body. The IWC meets annually and adopts a binding "schedule" that regulates catch limits, whaling methods, protected areas, and the right to carry out scientific research involving the killing of whales.

Members
As of January 2021, there are 88 parties to the convention. The initial signatories were Argentina, Australia, Brazil, Canada, Chile, Denmark, France, the Netherlands, New Zealand, Norway, Peru, South Africa, the Soviet Union, the United Kingdom and the United States.

Although Norway is party to the convention, it maintains an objection to the 1986 IWC global moratorium and it does not apply to it.

Withdrawals
Eight states have withdrawn from the convention since its ratification: Canada, Egypt, Greece, Jamaica, Mauritius, Philippines, the Seychelles and Venezuela.

Belize, Brazil, Dominica, Ecuador, Iceland, Japan, New Zealand, and Panama have all withdrawn from the convention temporarily but ratified it second time; the Netherlands, Norway, and Sweden have each withdrawn from the convention twice, only to have accepted it a third time.

Japan is the most recent member to depart, in January 2019, so as to resume commercial whaling.

Effectiveness 
There have been consistent disagreement over the scope of the convention. The 1946 Convention does not define a 'whale'. Some members of IWC claim that it has the legal competence to regulate catches of only great whales (the baleen whales and the sperm whale). Others believe that all cetaceans, including the smaller dolphins and porpoises, fall within IWC jurisdiction.

An analysis by the Carnegie Council determined that while the International Convention for the Regulation of Whaling has had "ambiguous success" owing to its internal divisions, it has nonetheless "successfully managed the historical transition from open whale hunting to highly restricted hunting. It has stopped all but the most highly motivated whale-hunting countries. This success has made its life more difficult, since it has left the hardest part of the problem for last."

References

External links

Text of the Convention at the IWC website
Ratifications

Environmental treaties
Whaling
Treaties concluded in 1946
Treaties entered into force in 1948
Whale conservation
1948 in the environment
1946 in Washington, D.C.
Treaties of Antigua and Barbuda
Treaties of Argentina
Treaties of Austria
Treaties of Australia
Treaties of Belgium
Treaties of Belize
Treaties of Benin
Treaties of the military dictatorship in Brazil
Treaties of Bulgaria
Treaties of Cambodia
Treaties of Cameroon
Treaties of Chile
Treaties of the Republic of China (1949–1971)
Treaties of the People's Republic of China
Treaties of Colombia
Treaties of the Republic of the Congo
Treaties of Costa Rica
Treaties of Ivory Coast
Treaties of Croatia
Treaties of Cyprus
Treaties of the Czech Republic
Treaties of Denmark
Treaties of Dominica
Treaties of the Dominican Republic
Treaties of Ecuador
Treaties of Eritrea
Treaties of Estonia
Treaties of Finland
Treaties of the French Fourth Republic
Treaties of Gabon
Treaties of the Gambia
Treaties of West Germany
Treaties of Ghana
Treaties of Grenada
Treaties of Guatemala
Treaties of Guinea
Treaties of Guinea-Bissau
Treaties of Hungary
Treaties of Iceland
Treaties of India
Treaties of Ireland
Treaties of Israel
Treaties of Italy
Treaties of Japan
Treaties of Kenya
Treaties of Kiribati
Treaties of South Korea
Treaties of Laos
Treaties of Lithuania
Treaties of Luxembourg
Treaties of Mali
Treaties of the Marshall Islands
Treaties of Mauritania
Treaties of Mexico
Treaties of Monaco
Treaties of Mongolia
Treaties of Morocco
Treaties of Nauru
Treaties of the Netherlands
Treaties of New Zealand
Treaties of Nicaragua
Treaties of Norway
Treaties of Oman
Treaties of Palau
Treaties of Panama
Treaties of Peru
Treaties of Poland
Treaties of Portugal
Treaties of Romania
Treaties of the Soviet Union
Treaties of Saint Kitts and Nevis
Treaties of Saint Lucia
Treaties of Saint Vincent and the Grenadines
Treaties of San Marino
Treaties of Senegal
Treaties of Slovakia
Treaties of Slovenia
Treaties of the Solomon Islands
Treaties of the Union of South Africa
Treaties of Spain
Treaties of Suriname
Treaties of Sweden
Treaties of Switzerland
Treaties of Tanzania
Treaties of Togo
Treaties of Tuvalu
Treaties of the United Kingdom
Treaties of the United States
Treaties of Uruguay
Treaties establishing intergovernmental organizations
Animal treaties
Treaties extended to Aruba
Treaties extended to the Netherlands Antilles
Treaties extended to Greenland
Treaties extended to the Faroe Islands